Cumméne Find (Latinised, Cummeneus Albus, Cumméne "the White", died 669) was the seventh abbot of Iona (657–669). He was the nephew of a previous abbot, Ségéne and great-nephew of Lasrén. It was during Cumméne's abbacy that the Northumbrians decided against adopting the Gaelic dating of Easter at the Synod of Whitby in 664, resulting in the loss of control of the Ionan offshoot Gaelic church at Lindisfarne. In 664, the last Gaelic abbot/bishop of Lindisfarne, Colmán, resigned his post and returned to Iona. It was during Cumméne's abbacy that the Book of Durrow was first produced, although this probably happened at Durrow itself, rather than Iona. Cumméne is known to have visited Ireland in 663, perhaps on a tour of daughter houses.
 
He is known to have written a Vita of Columba, "De uirtutibus sancti Columbae ("On the Virtues of Saint Columba").  This text was then later inserted into the Schaffhausen manuscript of Adomnán's Vita Columbae for political reasons in the script of the early eighth century.

He died on 24 February 669.

References

Bibliography
 Sharpe, Richard, Adomnán of Iona: Life of St. Columba, (London, 1995)

669 deaths
Abbots of Iona
Irish writers
Medieval Irish writers
7th-century historians
Medieval Irish historians
7th-century Irish abbots
Irish expatriates in Scotland
Year of birth unknown